The 2015 Porsche Tennis Grand Prix was a women's tennis tournament played on indoor clay courts. It was the 38th edition of the Porsche Tennis Grand Prix, and part of the Premier tournaments of the 2015 WTA Tour. It took place at the Porsche Arena in Stuttgart, Germany, from 20 April through 26 April 2015. Unseeded Angelique Kerber won the singles title.

Points and prize money

Point distribution

Prize money 

* per team

Singles main draw entrants

Seeds 

 1 Rankings are as of April 13, 2015.

Other entrants 
The following players received wildcards into the main draw:
  Julia Görges
  Carina Witthöft

The following players received entry from the qualifying draw:
  Kateryna Bondarenko
  Petra Martić
  Bethanie Mattek-Sands
  Evgeniya Rodina

The following players received entry as lucky losers:
  Alberta Brianti
  Alexa Glatch
  Marina Melnikova

Withdrawals 
Before the tournament
  Eugenie Bouchard →replaced by  Madison Brengle
  Jelena Janković (right foot injury) →replaced by  Alexa Glatch
  Svetlana Kuznetsova (left adductor) →replaced by  Alberta Brianti
  Peng Shuai →replaced by  Zarina Diyas
  Andrea Petkovic (left thigh injury) →replaced by  Marina Melnikova

Doubles main draw entrants

Seeds 

 Rankings are as of April 13, 2015.

Other entrants 
The following pairs received wildcards into the main draw:
  Belinda Bencic /  Simona Halep
  Antonia Lottner /  Carina Witthöft

Finals

Singles 

  Angelique Kerber defeated  Caroline Wozniacki, 3–6, 6–1, 7–5

Doubles 

  Bethanie Mattek-Sands /  Lucie Šafářová defeated  Caroline Garcia /  Katarina Srebotnik, 6–4, 6–3

References

External links 
 Official website
 Women's Tennis Association (WTA) tournament profile
 Women's Tennis Association (WTA) tournament event details

Porsche Tennis Grand Prix
Porsche Tennis Grand Prix
Porsche Tennis Grand Prix
2010s in Baden-Württemberg
Porsch